John Michael West (born October 29, 1964) is an American vocalist and guitarist, perhaps best known as the lead vocalist of Artension and the former lead vocalist of Royal Hunt.

Early career 
Prior to his joining Royal Hunt in 1998, West contributed vocals to a variety of projects. His recording career began in 1986 as the singer of Diamond. Later, he sang for Destiny, who released the four-song demo Side By Side in 1989. He had brief stints replacing Ray Gillen in both Badlands and Sun Red Sun in the mid-1990s, also lending his voice to Cozy Powell's final solo album, Especially For You during this period. In lesser known projects, he also sang one track on Marc Ferrari's solo album Guest List in 1995, also handling vocal duties on self-titled albums by Many Moons and Rider the following year.

Artension 
In 1996, West joined neoclassical power/progressive metal group Artension, who released their debut album Into The Eye of the Storm the same year. The band went on to release seven studio albums from 1996–2004. The group's second album, Phoenix Rising, is especially noted for West's wide-ranging vocal contributions. West and the band regrouped in 2016 with the intention of releasing a new album.

Royal Hunt 
In 1998, West replaced D.C. Cooper as the lead singer of Royal Hunt, remaining with the group until 2007. He recorded four studio albums, one live album, and one EP with the group. West's ten-year tenure as the band's vocalist is the longest uninterrupted tenure of any singer in Royal Hunt's 25-year history.

Solo career 
West has released four albums under his own name, which have featured a wide variety of contributors. His first two, Mind Journey (1997) and Permanent Mark (1998), adopted a neoclassical metal style with many extended instrumental sections. After concentrating on Royal Hunt for a few years, West returned in 2002 with the concept album Earth Maker, which showcased a more song-oriented writing style while still retaining much of his previous sound. Finally, in 2006, West released Long Time No Sing, which is more of a blues-rock album. The latter disc features West playing guitar as well as singing.

Post-Royal Hunt 
Since departing from Royal Hunt in 2007, West has lent his voice to a wide variety of projects. He appeared as the lead singer for Bosnian guitarist Emir Hot on his debut album Sevdah Metal in 2008 and keyboardist Mistheria's solo effort "Dragon Fire" in 2010. In 2012, he sang on symphonic metal band Mythodea's self-titled debut album, and in 2013, he collaborated with former Artension guitarist Roger Staffelbach to form Artlantica, an Artension-styled band that went on to release an album called Across The Seven Seas. He also appeared on Chilean progpower band Delta's fifth album, The End of Philosophy, singing a duet with the band's regular vocalist, Felipe del Valle, on the track "Bringers of Rain." After del Valle left the band in 2014, West recorded new versions of Delta's songs "New Philosophy" and "Regrets" as singles and also appeared with the band on the Progressive Nation at Sea cruise.

West has also toured as the singer for Uli Jon Roth's band and Ronnie James Dio/Ritchie Blackmore tribute band Black Knights Rising. He also collaborated with Danish guitar virtuoso Niels Vejlyt on a project called Sage's Recital, which put out their self-titled debut album in 2013 and followup The Winter Symphony in 2016.

Discography

Solo work 
 Mind Journey (1997)
 Permanent Mark (1998)
 Earth Maker (2002)
 Long Time... No Sing (2006)
 Johnny and Lonnie – "Greatest Misses" (2006)

Collaborations 

With  Artension
 Into the Eye of the Storm (1996)
 Phoenix Rising (1997)
 Forces of Nature (1999)
 Machine (2000)
 Sacred Pathways (2001)
 New Discovery (2002)
 Future World (2004)

With Rider
 Rider (1996)

With Royal Hunt
 Fear (1999)
 Intervention (2001)
 The Watchers (2001)
 The Mission (2001)
 On The Mission 2002 (2002)
 Eyewitness (2003)
 Paper Blood (2005)
 2006 Live (2006)
 Royal Hunt 2006 (DVD; 2006)

With Ten Man Push
 Ten Man Push (2007)
 Playin' In The Dirt (2009)
 Branded (2013)

With Cozy Powell
 Especially For You (1999)

With Feinstein
 Third Wish (2004)

With Emir Hot
 Sevdah Metal (2008)

With Mythodea
 Mythodea (2012)

With Sage's Recital
 Sage's Recital (2013)
 The Winter Symphony (2016)

With Artlantica
 Across The Seven Seas (2013)

Guest Appearances
Marc Ferrari – Guest List (1995)
Sun Red Sun – Sun Red Sun (1994)
James Murphy – Feeding The Machine (1999)
Iron Maiden Tribute – Slave To The Power (2000)
Savatage – Poets and Madmen (2001)
Roger Staffelbach's Angel of Eden – "The End of Never" (2007)
Mistheria – "Dragon Fire" (2010)
Delta – "The End of Philosophy" (2013)
American Mafia – "Rock 'N' Roll Hit Machine" (2014)
Forces United – II (2015)
Crimson Cry – Lost Reality (2017)

Other releases
Many Moons – "Many Moons" (1996)

References

External links 
John West Music

American male singers
American heavy metal singers
American rock guitarists
American male guitarists
Badlands (American band) members
Lynch Mob (band) members
Living people
Native American singers
Musicians from Syracuse, New York
1964 births
20th-century American guitarists
Royal Hunt members
20th-century American male musicians
Yngwie J. Malmsteen's Rising Force members
Frontiers Records artists
Shrapnel Records artists